Bispham is a civil parish in the West Lancashire district of Lancashire, England.  It contains three listed buildings that are recorded in the National Heritage List for England.  All the listed buildings are designated at Grade II, the lowest of the three grades, which is applied to "buildings of national importance and special interest". Apart from the village of Bispham Green, the parish is rural.  The listed buildings comprise a farmhouse and two farm buildings.


Buildings

Notes and references

Notes

Citations

Sources

Lists of listed buildings in Lancashire
Buildings and structures in the Borough of West Lancashire